LC4 may refer to:

 Chaise Longue LC4, a chaise longue designed by the Swiss architect Le Corbusier and French architect Charlotte Perriand
 Buckley LC-4 Witchcraft, all-metal monoplane aircraft
 Buick LC4 V6 car engine
 KTM LC4, 1-cylinder 4-stroke motorcycle engine
 LC4 (classification), para-cycling classification
 Cytochrome c oxidase (launch complex 4), a component of the electron transport system
 Cape Canaveral Air Force Station Launch Complex 4, one of the first series of launch complexes to be built at Cape Canaveral Air Force Station, used in the 1950s.
 Vandenberg Air Force Base Space Launch Complex 4, a launch site at Vandenberg Air Force Base, currently active.

See also

 Local Council IV (LCIV), a type of local administration in Uganda; see Local Council (Uganda)
 Late Cypriot IV (LC IV), a period of Bronze Age Prehistoric Cyprus
 Mac LC IV, informally referring to the Apple Macintosh LC III+
 Launch Complex 4 (disambiguation)
 
 
 LC (disambiguation)